The women's curling tournament of the 2022 Winter Olympics was held at the Beijing National Aquatics Center from 10 to 20 February 2022. Ten nations competed in a round robin preliminary round, and the top four nations at the conclusion of the round robin qualified for the medal round.

Competition schedule

Qualification

The top six nations at the 2021 World Women's Curling Championship qualified along with hosts China. The final three teams qualified through the 2021 Olympic Qualification Event.

Teams
The teams are listed as follows:

Round-robin standings

Round-robin results
All draw times are listed in China Standard Time (UTC+08:00).

Draw 1
Thursday, 10 February, 9:05

Draw 2
Thursday, 10 February, 20:05

Draw 3
Friday, 11 February, 14:05

Draw 4
Saturday, 12 February, 9:05

Draw 5
Saturday, 12 February, 20:05

Draw 6
Sunday, 13 February, 14:05

Draw 7
Monday, 14 February, 9:05

Draw 8
Monday, 14 February, 20:05

Draw 9
Tuesday, 15 February, 14:05

Draw 10
Wednesday, 16 February, 9:05

Draw 11
Wednesday, 16 February, 20:05

Draw 12
Thursday, 17 February, 14:05

Playoffs

Semifinals
Friday, 18 February, 20:05

Bronze medal game
Saturday, 19 February, 20:05

Gold medal game
Sunday, 20 February, 9:05

Final standings
The final standings are:

Statistics

Player percentages

Percentages by draw.

Lead

Second

Third

Fourth

Alternate

Team total

References

women
Women's events at the 2022 Winter Olympics
2022 in women's curling